One World or None (1946) is an instructional documentary short film produced by the National Committee on Atomic Information in conjunction with Philip Ragan Productions. Made just months after the Atomic bombings of Hiroshima and Nagasaki, it is considered the first postwar "atomic scare" film.

Synopsis
One World or None established that throughout history, scientists from many nations have made great advances and discoveries and have shared that knowledge globally. The periodic table was developed by Russian chemist Dmitri Mendeleev, British scientist J. J. Thomson and his team discovered the principle of the electron, and German theorist Albert Einstein came up with the theory of relativity. Nuclear physics was a product of New Zealand physicist Ernest Rutherford's work on the atomic nucleus, Danish physicist Niels Bohr's identification of  atomic structure and American physicist Carl David Anderson's discovery of the positron.

Other advances included English physicist James Chadwick discovering the neutron, while French scientists Irène Joliot-Curie and her husband Frédéric Joliot-Curie studied artificial radioactivity. Further nuclear research was carried out by Enrico Fermi, who transmuted uranium based on Japanese physicist Hantaro Nagaoka's theories on the atom. German scientist Otto Hahn derived barium from uranium, while uranium was split by Austrian-Swedish physicist Lise Meitner.

Knowledge about atomic energy was shared by all. The question remains, will the people of the earth use this powerful energy to benefit humanity? The first outward manifestation is the atom bomb that was dropped on Hiroshima. Images of the city after the attack are startling.

Imagining the destruction inflicted in seconds on an American city. A metropolis such as New York City, Chicago or San Francisco would have its downtown core devastated by blast effects and radioactivity.

According to information provided by the Federation of American Scientists, the massive destructive power of the atom bomb is contrasted with earlier weapons of war. A Roman soldier's lance would only kill one enemy, Napoleon's cannon perhaps a dozen, the "Big Bertha" cannon could kill up to 88, and the V-2 killed as many of 168 individuals on average, but the first atom bomb killed more than 100,000 at Hiroshima.

The atom bomb was delivered by aircraft which had a limited range, but new bombers have an intercontinental range. Imagine the frightening prospect if Japan and Germany had had the atom bomb during the war. Attacks by the Axis powers could have brought World War II to an end, as there would have been no defense against a V-2 rocket carrying an atom bomb. Even with the short range of the rocket, all of England could have been attacked from bases in France. While only in the blueprint stage, advanced rockets capable of crossing the Atlantic could have destroyed the U.S. Eastern seaboard cities. U-boats armed with atom bombs delivered by rockets could have threatened more of North America. Fifth column sabotage using atom bombs could devastate any U.S. center.

The answer to atomic warfare is to have the nations of the world unite under the United Nations framework to counter the weapons of mass destruction. Representative of the peoples of the world are asked to make laws to abolish war with the choice being clear: unite as one world confronting evil or face death.

Production
Technical assistance on One World or None was provided by the Federation of Atomic Scientists. The federation was founded in November 1945 by Manhattan Project scientists who helped construct the first atom bombs. Their credo was that all scientists, engineers, and other "technically-trained thinkers" have an ethical obligation to ensure the technological "fruits of their intellect and labor" are applied to the benefit of humanity.

In early 1946, rebranded as the Federation of American Scientists, the organization took efforts to broaden and diversify its network of supporters to include all who want to reduce nuclear dangers and ultimately prevent global catastrophe. In 1946, just months after atom bombs were dropped on Hiroshima and Nagasaki, the scientists who had developed nuclear technology came together to express their concerns and thoughts about the nuclear age they had unleashed through the release of a book, One World or None. The anthology of essays included contributions from Niels Bohr, Albert Einstein, and Robert Oppenheimer, among others.

One World or None was critically reviewed in the New York Herald Tribune Book Review, March 17, 1946: "An illuminating, powerful, threatening and hopeful statement which will clarify a lot of confused thinking about atomic energy.”  The original edition sold 100,000 copies. Quickly rising to the top of The New York Times bestsellers' list, the book spawned the short film of the same name.

Philip Ragan Productions was responsible for One World or None, using a mix of animation and live-action stock footage, including scenes from Hiroshima and the Nuremberg War Trials. Philip Ragan was a filmmaker from Philadelphia who specialized in cartoon animation. In 1941, Ragan was contracted by John Grierson at the National Film Board of Canada (NFB) to complete a series of animated films for the National War Finance Committee promoting Victory War Bonds. Between 1941 and 1945, Ragan produced 27 animated films for the NFB, many of them educational films.

Another connection to the NFB was composer Louis Applebaum, who composed approximately 250 film scores for the NFB between 1942 and 1960. He is also known for his work in Hollywood on Story of G.I. Joe (1945), Dreams That Money Can Buy (1947) and Lost Boundaries (1949).

Reception
One World or None was produced for a theatrical market.  The film is widely considered the first postwar "atomic scare" film. It later went into the public domain and is now preserved at the Prelinger Archives.

See also
 Duck and cover, for further discussion of this method of self-defense
 List of films about nuclear issues
 List of films in the public domain in the United States
 Civil Defence Information Bulletin, a 1964 British film which deals with the same topic
 Protect and Survive, a 1970-80s British information film on the same topic

References

Notes

Citations

Bibliography

 Bogle, Lori Lynn. Cold War Culture and Society: The Cold War. London: Routledge, 2001. .
 Ellis, Jack C. and Betsy A. McLane. New History of Documentary Film. London: Continuum International Publishing Group, 2005. .
 Evans, Gary. John Grierson and the National Film Board: The Politics of Wartime Propaganda. Toronto: University of Toronto Press, 1984. .
 Giglio, Ernest. Here’s Looking at You: Hollywood, Film, and Politics. Peter Lang Inc., International Academic Publishers, 2005. .
 Shaw, Tony. Hollywood's Cold War. Amherst, Massachusetts: University of Massachusetts Press, 2007. .

External links
 One World or None at YouTube
 "One World or None" book at Amazon

1946 films
1946 animated films
1940s American animated films
American black-and-white films
American social guidance and drug education films
Disaster preparedness in the United States
Films about nuclear war and weapons
Articles containing video clips
Nuclear safety and security
United States civil defense
Films scored by Louis Applebaum